Clear Creek is a stream in Montgomery County in the U.S. state of Missouri. It is a tributary of the Loutre River.

Clear Creek was so named on account of the clarity of its water.

See also
List of rivers of Missouri

References

Rivers of Montgomery County, Missouri
Rivers of Missouri